Without Honor is a 1932 American pre-Code Western film directed by William Nigh.

Plot
The screenplay concerns a gambler who joins the Texas Rangers in hopes of finding the true perpetrators of the killings in which his brother is implicated.

Cast
Harry Carey as Pete Marlan
Mae Busch as Mary Ryan
Gibson Gowland as Mike Donovan
Mary Jane Irving as Bernice Donovan
Ed Brady as Lopez Venero
Jack Richardson as Steve Henderson
Tom London as "Sholt" Fletcher
Lafe McKee as Ranger Captain Frank Henderson
Lee Sage as Jack Marlan, Texas Ranger
Maston Williams as Jim Bowman, the gambler

External links

1932 films
1932 Western (genre) films
American black-and-white films
American Western (genre) films
Films with screenplays by Harry L. Fraser
Films directed by William Nigh
1930s English-language films
1930s American films